How I Met Your Mother (often abbreviated to HIMYM) is an American sitcom that premiered on CBS on September 19, 2005, and concluded on March 31, 2014. The series follows Ted Mosby (Josh Radnor) and his group of friends, Marshall Eriksen (Jason Segel), Robin Scherbatsky (Cobie Smulders), Lily Aldrin (Alyson Hannigan), and Barney Stinson (Neil Patrick Harris). As a framing device, Ted, in the year 2030, recounts to his son and daughter the events that led him to meeting their mother.

The show was created by Craig Thomas and Carter Bays, who also serve as the show's executive producers and frequent writers. The series was loosely inspired by their friendship when they both lived in New York City. Known for its unique structure and eccentric humor, How I Met Your Mother has received positive reviews throughout most of its run and has gained a cult following over the years.

The show has been nominated for 91 awards, winning 21. The show has been nominated for 30 Primetime Emmy Awards, including a nomination for Outstanding Comedy Series. Stars Alyson Hannigan and Neil Patrick Harris have each received acting accolades, with both receiving People's Choice Awards, and Harris receiving Emmy and Golden Globe nominations. In 2012, seven years after its premiere, the series won the People's Choice for Favorite Network TV Comedy. The show's art direction, editing and cinematography have also been awarded.

Awards and nominations

Notes

References

External links
Official website
Awards for How I Met Your Mother at Internet Movie Database

Awards and nominations
How I Met Your Mother